Grégory Besson-Moreau (born 7 July 1982) is a French politician of La République En Marche! (LREM) who was a member of the French National Assembly from 2017 to 2022, representing the department of Aube.

Political career
In parliament, Besson-Moreau served as member of the Committee on Economic Affairs. In 2018, he led the Assembly's special enquiry into a 2017 salmonella outbreak at a Lactalis milk factory that led to dozens of babies falling ill.

In addition to his committee assignments, Besson-Moreau was part of the French-Chinese Parliamentary Friendship Group and the French Parliamentary Friendship Group with the United Kingdom.

He lost his seat in the 2022 election to Jordan Guitton of National Rally.

Political positions
In July 2019, Besson-Moreau voted in favor of the French ratification of the European Union’s Comprehensive Economic and Trade Agreement (CETA) with Canada.

See also
 2017 French legislative election

References

1982 births
Living people
Deputies of the 15th National Assembly of the French Fifth Republic
La République En Marche! politicians
People from Seine-et-Marne
Politicians from Île-de-France
Members of Parliament for Aube